Prasophyllum occidentale, commonly known as the plains leek orchid, is a species of orchid endemic to southern continental Australia. It has a single tubular leaf and up to twenty five small, pale yellowish-green flowers. It is found in South Australia and Victoria although regarded by some taxonomists as a South Australian endemic.

Description
As with others in the genus, the flowers are inverted so that the labellum is above the column rather than below it. The upturned part has crinkled edges and there is a raised, shiny green or brownish callus in the centre of the labellum and extending almost to its tip. Flowering occurs from August to October.

Taxonomy and naming
Prasophyllum occidentale was first formally described in 1908 by Richard Sanders Rogers and the description was published in Transactions, proceedings and report, Royal Society of South Australia. The specific epithet (occidentale) is a Latin word meaning "western".

Distribution and habitat
The plains leek orchid grows in grassy places and in shrubland and is common and widespread, mostly in the west of South Australia. It is less common in Victoria, occurring in the south-west of that state. Some authorities regard this species as a South Australian endemic, and collections in Victoria to be of a closely related, as yet undescribed species.

References

External links 
 

occidentale
Flora of South Australia
Flora of Victoria (Australia)
Endemic orchids of Australia
Plants described in 1908